Bai Chali Sasariye is a 1988 Rajasthani language film. The movie ran for 100 days and thus created a history in Rajasthan cinema.

It was reported in 2004 that the film helped revive interest in films made in the Rajasthani language, but an article in 2005, speaking toward the decline of the Rajasthani film industry, reported that Bai Chali Sasariye was the only successful Rajasthani film over the previous 15 years. This movie was remade in Telugu as Puttinti Pattu Cheera (1990), Marathi as Maherchi Sadi (1991), in Kannada as Thavarumane Udugore (1991) and later in Hindi as Saajan Ka Ghar (1994) starring Juhi Chawla and Rishi Kapoor.

Plot

Box office
It was the most successful Rajasthani movie in the period 1990–2005.

Starcast

Upasana Singh as Lakshmi
Gyan Shivpuri as Amar (Lakshmi's husband) 
Lalita Pawar as Amar's Mother and Lakshmi's Saasu Maa
Neelu Vaghela as Bhomlee
Alankar Joshi as Suraj (Lakshmi's Brother) Bhomlee's love interest
Ramesh Tiwari as Seth Umed Ram (Suraj and lakshmi's father) 
Devyani Thakkar as Suraj's Mother and Lakshmi's Step Mother
Manik Irani as Kaaliya
Jagdeep as Comedian

Songs
All songs of this film were very popular and the title song "Bai Chali Sasariye" is being used as title song in the popular serial Balika Vadhu on Colors channel. Some songs of the film are:
Bai chali sasariye
Banna re
Bhomli aayee
Hiwde ro har
Rupiyo to le mhen
Talariya magariya
Veera re

See also
Cinema of Rajasthan
Rajasthani Language

References

External links
 

1988 films
Rajasthani-language films
Films set in Rajasthan
Rajasthani films remade in other languages